The Brazil U-17 women's national football team is an international youth football team.  Its primary role is the development of players in preparation for the Brazil women's national football team.

Fixtures and results

Legend

2018

2020

2022

Current squad
The 22-player squad was announced on 11 November 2020 for two friendlies against Chile.

Head Coach: Simone Jatobá

Previous squads
 2008 FIFA U-17 Women's World Cup
 2010 FIFA U-17 Women's World Cup
 2012 FIFA U-17 Women's World Cup
 2016 FIFA U-17 Women's World Cup
 2018 FIFA U-17 Women's World Cup

Competitive record

U-17 Women's World Cup

South American Under-17 Women's Championship

See also
 Brazil women's national football team
 Brazil women's national under-20 football team

References

National youth sports teams of Brazil
Youth football in Brazil
Women's national under-17 association football teams
South American women's national under-17 association football teams